Billy Anderson may refer to:
Broncho Billy Anderson (1880–1971), American actor and filmmaker
Billy Anderson (running back) (born 1929), American football player
Billy Anderson (quarterback) (1941–1996), American football player
Billy Anderson (Australian footballer) (1892–1954), Australian rules footballer
Billy Dean Anderson (1934–1979), armed robber on the FBI Ten Most Wanted Fugitives list
Billy Anderson (producer), American record producer and musician active since 1988

See also
William Anderson (disambiguation)
Wil Anderson (born 1974), Australian comedian, performing stand-up, as well as on television and radio
Bill Andersen (1924–2005), New Zealand Communist and trade union leader
Bill Andersen (politician) (born 1936)